Instigator Regni (lat.), Instygator Koronny (pol.) – Lord Prosecutor of the Crown, highest central non-senatorial dignitary in Polish–Lithuanian Commonwealth, created in 1557.

In His name, the Instigators were to prosecute crimes against the State as well as offenses against the King, and they were permitted to pursue any noble dignitary other than the King. It was a court office, rank, and title that the King had awarded for life. They had advisory voice in assessory courts and decisive voice in referendary courts. After 1764 they controlled treasury committees.
There was one Instigator for the Crown and one for Grand Duchy of Lithuania until 1775, when four new Instigator offices were introduced by promoting to that honour their two assistants. Annual salary of Instigator Regni was 6 thousand Polish złoty of those times.

Polish titles
Lithuanian titles
Obsolete occupations